Lieutenant-General Sir David Ximenes KCH (1777–1848) was a British Army officer, magistrate and Berkshire landowner.

He was a descendant of Cardinal Ximenes de Cisneros, the Grand Inquisitor. His family converted to the Anglican faith in the late 18th century and were amongst the first Jewish families to do so. This was in order to serve in official capacities within the British power structure, then prohibited to non-Anglicans. It appears that they did not have to do much with the Jewish community in England after that time. He was the youngest son of David Ximenes Senior of Bear Place at Hare Hatch, near Wargrave in Berkshire, and brother to Sir Morris Ximenes of the same place. He was present at the Battle of Waterloo. In England, he lived at Bear Ash, also at Hare Hatch in Berkshire.

External links
Contemporaneous information on Lieutenant-General Sir David Ximenes and Bear Place
Noting his descent from Cardinal Ximenes

1777 births
1848 deaths
Converts to Anglicanism from Judaism
British Anglicans
British Army generals
British Army personnel of the Napoleonic Wars
People from Wargrave
British Sephardi Jews
British people of Spanish-Jewish descent